Kalophrynus baluensis (common names: Malaysian grainy frog, Balu sticky frog, Kinabalu sticky frog) is a species of frog in the family Microhylidae. It is endemic to Mount Kinabalu in Sabah (East Malaysia, Borneo).

Kalophrynus baluensis is unusual in that it appears to have diverged from its closest known relative that is not endemic to Mount Kinabalu before the mountain reached its present elevation. Most other Mount Kinabalu endemics are younger than the mountain (approximately 6 million years), and thus appear to have evolved there relatively recently.

Description
Kalophrynus baluensis is a stocky, short-legged frog. Its brown colouration makes its perfectly camouflaged in its habitat, the leaf litter layer on the forest floor.

Habitat and conservation
Natural habitats of Kalophrynus baluensis are montane oak-chestnut forests at elevations of  asl. They are usually encountered on the forest floor. Male advertisement calls have been heard some distance away from water, suggesting that it might breed in phytotelmata.

There are no major threats to the species, and it is known to occur in the Kinabalu National Park. Nevertheless, its total area of distribution is relatively small.

References

baluensis
Endemic fauna of Borneo
Endemic fauna of Malaysia
Amphibians of Malaysia
Taxonomy articles created by Polbot
Amphibians described in 1984
Amphibians of Borneo
Fauna of Mount Kinabalu
Fauna of the Borneo montane rain forests